Yellow Dubmarine is an American reggae Beatles tribute band, based out of Washington, D.C., United States. The band is known for their live performances, blending "various elements of reggae, dub, funk and rocksteady" in order to recreate and pay tribute to The Beatles.

Discography

Albums
Abbey Dub (September 30, 2011)

References

External links
Jambase.com
Jambands.com
Headstash.com
Reisterstown.patch.com

2010 establishments in Washington, D.C.
American reggae musical groups
Musical groups established in 2010
Musical groups from Baltimore
Musical groups from Washington, D.C.
The Beatles tribute bands